Pavlos Fotiadis (born 15 November 1964) is a Cypriot alpine skier. He competed in two events at the 1984 Winter Olympics.

References

1964 births
Living people
Cypriot male alpine skiers
Olympic alpine skiers of Cyprus
Alpine skiers at the 1984 Winter Olympics
Sportspeople from Nicosia